Russell Pitzer may refer to:

 Russell K. Pitzer (1878–1978), American orange grower and philanthropist
 Russell M. Pitzer (born 1938), American theoretical chemist and educator